Tobias is the transliteration of the  which is a translation of the Hebrew biblical name . With the biblical Book of Tobit being present in the Deuterocanonical books and Biblical apocrypha, Tobias is a popular male given name for both Christians and Jews in English-speaking countries, German-speaking countries, the Low Countries, and Scandinavian countries. In English-speaking countries, it is often shortened to Toby. In German, this name appears as Tobias or Tobi; in French as Tobie; and in Swedish as Tobias or Tobbe. Tobias has also been a surname.

In other languages  
 Danish, Norwegian, German, Dutch, Swedish, Portuguese: Tobias
 Amharic: ጦቢያ Ṭobiya
 Catalan: Tobies
 Czech: Tobiáš, Tobias
 Croatian: Tobijaš
 Finnish: Topias, Topi
 French: Tobie
 Greek: Τωβίας (Tobías)
 Hebrew: Tovia, Tuvya
 Hungarian: Tóbiás
 Italian: Tobia (name)
 Lithuanian: Tobijas
 Polish: Tobiasz
 Russian: Товий (Toviy)
 Spanish: Tobías
 Slovak: Tobiáš
 Yiddish: טבֿיה (Tevye)

Only name

Biblical
Several people are called Tobias or similar names in the Bible era:
Tobias, son of Tobit; "Book of Tobias" is an older name for the Book of Tobit
Tobias the elder; the name used for Tobit in the Vulgate and Douay–Rheims Bible.
Tobijah, two persons mentioned in the Bible: a Levite in the reign of Jehoshaphat (2 Chronicles 17:8) and a Jew travelling from Babylon to Jerusalem with precious metal for Zerubbabel (Zechariah 6:10,14).
Tobiah (Ammonite) - a significant leader of the opponents of Nehemiah as recorded in that book.
Tobiads, a Jewish or Ammonite faction at the beginning of the Maccabean period

Other
Tobias, Christian martyr, see Agapius, Atticus, Carterius, Styriacus, Tobias, Eudoxius, Nictopolion, and Companions
Tobias of Jerusalem, 2nd-century bishop
Tobias (bishop of Rochester), died 726

Given name
Tobias Abse (professor)
Tobias Abstreiter (hockey center)
Tobias Angerer (cross country skier)
Tobias Arlt (luger)
Tobias Bamberg (magician)
Tobias Barreto (critic/poet)
Tobias Beecher (from the TV series Oz)
Tobias Beer (actor)
Tobias Bernstrup (contemporary artist)
Tobias Billström (politician)
Tobias Bjarneby (video game journalist)
Tobias de Boer (scientist)
Tobias Bogner (ski jumper)
Tobias Bonhoeffer (neurobiologist)
Tobias Bridge (Major-General in the First English Civil War)
Tobias S. Buckell (science fiction author)
Tobias Capwell (born ), American curator, military historian and jouster
Tobias Carlsson (Kalmar FF footballer)
Tobías Zúñiga Castro (politician)
Tobias Cohn (17/18th century physician)
Tobias Cole (countertenor)
Tobias Joaquim Dai (politician)
Tobias Dantzig (mathematician)
Tobias Delius (musician)
Tobias Dier (golfer)
Tobias Druitt (author, pseudonym)
Tobiah ben Eliezer
Tobias Ellwood (politician)
Tobias Enhus (composer)
Tobias Enström (hockey defenceman)
Tobias Exxel (bass player from Edguy)
Tobias Forge (musician - Repugnant, Subvision, Ghost)
Tobias Fornell (character on the TV series "NCIS")
Tobias Forsberg (hockey winger)
Tobias Frere-Jones (type designer)
Tobias Fünke (character in the TV series Arrested Development)
Tobias Furneaux (Royal Navy officer)
Tobías García Mota (Dominican-Mexican)
Tobias Geffen (rabbi)
Tobias Gentleman (fl. 1614, English mariner and writer) 
Tobias Grahn (Gimnàstic de Tarragona midfielder)
Tobias Gregson (fictional character in a number of the "Sherlock Holmes" novels)
Tobias Grünenfelder (Swiss alpine skier)
Tobias Harris (National Basketball Association player)
Tobias Hecht (American anthropologist, ethnographer, and translator)
Tobías Hernández (Major League Baseball player)
Tobias Hill (poet/novelist)
Tobias Hoesl (German television actor)
Tobias Hogan (1823–1904, politician from Monticello, Minnesota)
Tobias Holmberg (Swedish Bandy player)
Tobias Holmqvist (Swedish footballer)
Tobias Hume (composer & soldier)
Tobias Hysén (IFK Göteborg footballer)
Detective Tobias Jones (fictional character)
Tobias Jones (writer) (author & journalist)
Tobias Kamke (German tennis player)
Tobias Karlsson (songwriter) (Swedish record producer)
Tobias Kassung (German classical guitarist and composer)
Tobias Krantz (Swedish politician)
Tobías Lasser (Venezuelan botanist)
Tobias Lear V (personal secretary)
Tobias Levels (German-Dutch footballer)
Tobias Lindemann (German architect, designer and media entrepreneur)
Tobias Linderoth (Galatasaray midfielder)
Tobias Lohner (1619 - 1697, Austrian Jesuit theologian)
Tobias Mabuta Munihango (Namibian amateur boxer)
Tobias Matthay (teacher & composer)
Tobias Matthew (archbishop of York)
Tobias Mayer (astronomer)
Tobias Mehler (Canadian actor)
Tobias Menzies (actor)
Tobias Michael Carel Asser (jurist)
Tobias Mikaelsson (Swedish football player)
Tobias Mikkelsen (Danish football player)
Tobias Moretti (actor)
Tobias Mullen (1818-1900, Irish-born clergyman of the Roman Catholic Church, Bishop of Erie)
Tobias Müller (disambiguation)
Tobias Nath (German television actor)
Tobias Nickenig (German footballer)
Tobias Norris (politician)
Tobias Palmer (American football player)
Tobias Picker (composer)
Tobias Pflüger (politician)
Tobias A. Plants (1811 – 1887, U.S. Representative from Ohio)
Tobias Pock (Austrian Baroque painter)
Tobias Pullen (Irish bishop)
Tobias Ragg (from musical Sweeney Todd)
Tobias Rathgeb (German football midfielder)
Tobias Rau (retired German footballer)
Tobias Read (member of the Oregon House of Representatives)
Tobias Regner (musician)
Tobias Reinhardt (classical scholar)
Tobias Rustat (1606?-1694, benefactor of the University of Cambridge)
Tobias Sammet (vocalist from Edguy)
Tobias Schellenberg (competitive diver)
Tobias Schenke (German actor)
Tobias Schiegl (Austrian luger)
Tobias Schneebaum (artist & activist)
Tobias Schneider (German speedskater)
Tobias Schönenberg (actor & photomodel)
Tobias Schweinsteiger (German footballer)
Tobias Simon (Miami civil rights lawyer)
Tobias Sippel (German football goalkeeper)
Tobias Sjokvist (born 1995), Swedish ice hockey player
Tobias Smollett (Scottish author)
Tobias Steinhauser (former German cyclist)
Tobias Stephan (hockey goaltender)
Tobias Stimmer (painter & illustrator)
Tobias Summerer (German tennis player)
Tobias Tal (Dutch rabbi)
Tobias Tornkvist (born 1994), Swedish ice hockey player
Tobias Truvillion (African-American actor)
Tobias Unger (athlete)
Tobias Verhaecht (draughtsman)
Tobias Verwey (Namibian cricketer)
Tobias Viklund (Swedish ice hockey defenceman)
Tobias Weis (German footballer)
Tobias Wendl (German luger)
Tobias Whale (fictional character in DC comics)
Tobias Willi (former German football player)
Tobias Wolff (writer)
Tobias Zachary Ziegler (fictional character in the TV drama The West Wing)

Derivative name

Tobey Maguire (actor) 
Toby Isaacs (fictional character from the TV series Degrassi: The Next Generation)
Toby Jessel (British politician)

Fictional
Tobias Beckett, character in Solo: A Star Wars Story and mentor to Han Solo
Tobias Fornell, character on the CBS show, NCIS
Tobias Fünke, character on the Fox sitcom, Arrested Development
Tobias, character on the CBS daytime drama series, The Young and the Restless
Tobias Snape, father of Severus Snape from the Harry Potter series
Tobias Eaton, a protagonist in a series of novels by Veronica Roth known as the Divergent trilogy
Jeffery Tobias Winger, character on the sitcom Community
Tobias Wilson, character on The Amazing World of Gumball
Tobias Zachary Ziegler, character on The West Wing
Tobias, character on the AMC drama Fear The Walking Dead
Tobias, character on Pokémon
Tobias Tenma, protagonist of Astro Boy (Movie)
Tobias, character in the book series Animorphs and its TV adaptation
Tobias Rieper, false name used by Agent 47 on the video game Hitman

As a surname

Places
Tobias, Nebraska, a village in the United States
Tobias, Ohio, a village in the United States
Tobias Barreto, Sergipe, a municipality in Brazil
Tobias Fornier, Antique, a municipality in the Philippines
Tobías Bolaños International Airport in Costa Rica
Tobias-Thompson Complex, a United States National Historic Landmark

Companies
Tobias (bass guitar company)
Michael Tobias Design bass guitar company

Other
Tobias, a genus of crab spiders

English masculine given names
Norwegian masculine given names
Danish masculine given names
Swedish masculine given names
Icelandic masculine given names
Finnish masculine given names
German masculine given names
Dutch masculine given names
Hebrew-language names
Masculine given names

no:Tobias (andre betydninger)